Peter Aho (born 2 March 2003) is a Nigerian cricketer. In March 2019, he was part of the Nigeria national under-19 cricket team that qualified for the 2020 Under-19 Cricket World Cup. It was the first time that Nigeria had qualified for a Cricket World Cup tournament.

In September 2021, Aho was named in Nigeria's Twenty20 International (T20I) squad for the 2021–22 Uganda Tri-Nation Series tournament. He made his T20I debut on 11 September 2021, for Nigeria against Kenya. The following month, he was also named in Nigeria's T20I squad for their home series against Sierra Leone. In the fifth match of the series, Aho took six wickets for five runs to record the best ever bowling figures in a T20I match. He also became the first bowler for Nigeria to take a five-wicket haul and a hat-trick in a T20I match.

In October 2021, he was named in Nigeria's squad for the Regional Final of the 2021 ICC Men's T20 World Cup Africa Qualifier tournament in Rwanda.

References

External links
 

2003 births
Living people
Nigerian cricketers
Nigeria Twenty20 International cricketers
Place of birth missing (living people)
Twenty20 International hat-trick takers